Manish Maithani is an Indian football player who played as a central midfielder for Southern Samity and currently coaches a local club in Dehradun DESA FC.

Career

Mohun Bagan
After two seasons playing as a youth with Indian National Youth Teams Maithani signed for Mohun Bagan A.C. in 2009.
On 28 March, he had scored the equalizer against Shillong Lajong F.C., after coming in as a substitute.

Mohammedan (loan)
After the 2012–13 season ended, Maithani signed with IMG-Reliance to join their Indian Super League but due to objection from the I-League clubs in which they said they would not sign any players who joined the ISL it meant that Maithani would be without a club for a long period of time. Then, on 30 October 2013, it was announced that Mohammedan S.C. had broken that barrier when they signed Maithani on loan.

Maithani made his debut for Mohammedan in the I-League on 24 October 2013 United S.C. at the Salt Lake Stadium; in which he came on as a substitute for Jerry Zirsanga in the 73rd minute as Mohammedan drew the match 0–0.

FC Pune City
Mathani was drafted in by Indian Super League side FC Pune City for the 2014 Indian Super League.He played 2 matches in the 2014 Indian Super League.The next year he played 8 matches for the team.

Vitória de Guimarães B
Mathani was loaned out to 2nd division side Vitória de Guimarães B in Portugal from FC Pune City for 5 months.

Doon Elite Soccer Academy (DESA) 
Maithani started playing and coaching simultaneously, starting a local football academy. He has been coaching a promising bunch of talent in his academy with  national players like Rishi Upadhyay and Anubhav Rawat who has recently been selected in the Uttrakhand squad for Santosh Trophy 2021.

2022-2023 Season (DESA FC) 
DESA FC started the season in Dehradun District Soccer League winning all the games of Group Stage and advancing to the league stages comfortably.

International
Manish made his senior international debut against Azerbaijan for India on 27 February 2012.

Honours

India U23
SAFF Championship: 2009

See also
 List of Indian football players in foreign leagues

References

External links
 http://www.goal.com/en-india/people/india/35920/manish-mathani
 http://www.mohunbaganac.com/players/manish-maithani

1987 births
Living people
Mohun Bagan AC players
Mohammedan SC (Kolkata) players
I-League players
Sportspeople from Dehradun
Footballers from Uttarakhand
Indian footballers
India international footballers
India youth international footballers
Footballers at the 2010 Asian Games
Indian expatriate footballers
Association football midfielders
Asian Games competitors for India